Over the centuries, Uzbekistan has had a tradition of fostering equestrians and wrestlers (palvins). Some of the sports that originate in the country are the kurash, which is a type of upright wrestling. Other types of wrestling are belbogli kurash, turon, and boyqurgan all having the same origins. Other popular sports in Uzbekistan are football, boxing, wrestling, and judo.

Uzbekistan's capital Tashkent will host the 2025 Asian Youth Games.

Olympics

Since its independence in 1991, Uzbekistan has taken part in the Summer Olympics and Winter Olympics with increasing success. Uzbekistan has competed four times at the Summer Olympics, collecting one gold medal and five bronze medals in boxing, two gold medals and two silver medals in wrestling, and a silver medal in judo. Uzbekistan's only medal at the Winter Olympics was a gold medal in cross-country skiing in 1994. In the 2016 Rio Olympics Ruslan Nurudinov won gold in the men's 105kg weightlifting, lifting a total of 431kg, including an Olympic record 237kg in the clean & jerk.

Uzbek atheletes were particularly successful at the 2021 Olympic games in Tokyo. The country won three gold medals: Ulugbek Rashitov in Taekwondo, Akbar Djuraev in Weightlifting and Bakhodir Jalolov in Boxing. Uzbek gymnast Oxana Chusovitina also competed in her 8th Olympic games under the Uzbek flag at the event.

Football

Football is the most popular sport in Uzbekistan. Uzbekistan's premier football league is the Uzbek League, which features 14 teams since 2010, before 16. The current champions are Lokomotiv Tashkent, and the team with the most championships is FC Pakhtakor Tashkent with eight. The current Player of the Year (2017) is Marat Bikmaev.

The most successful football clubs in Uzbekistan are FC Bunyodkor, FC Pakhtakor and FC Nasaf. In 2011, FC Nasaf won AFC Cup and became the first Uzbekistan team to win the international club cup. Uzbek clubs previously participated in the now-defunct, formerly annual CIS Cup.

Uzbekistan U-16 won AFC U-16 Championship in 2012. In 2018 Uzbekistan U-23 became the champions in AFC U-23 Championship hosted by China. Uzbekistan national team's best achievement at the Asian Cup was a fourth-place finish at the 2011 AFC Asian Cup.

Ravshan Irmatov was named The Best Referee in Asia in four consecutive years (2008, 2009, 2010, 2011 and 2014). At Globe Soccer Awards in 2015 he was rewarded as Best Referee of The Year.

The Bunyodkor Stadium has a capacity of 34,000, and is mostly used for football matches.

Basketball

Uzbekistan used to be part of the powerful Soviet Union national basketball team. After the dissolution of the team, Uzbekistan founded its own team which was moderately successful between the mid-90s and mid-2000s.

Baseball

Ice Hockey
Uzbekistan used to be part of the Soviet Union national ice hockey team.

Humo Tashkent, a professional ice hockey team was established in 2019 with the aim of joining Kontinental Hockey League (KHL), a top level Eurasian league in future. Humo will join the second-tier Supreme Hockey League (VHL) for the 2019-20 season. Humo play their games at the Humo Ice Dome costing over €175 million; both the team and arena derive their name from the mythical Huma bird, a symbol of happiness and freedom.

Humo Tashkent was a member of the reformed Uzbekistan Ice Hockey League which began play in February 2019. The UIHL consisted of three other teams Binokor Tashkent, HK Tashkent, & Semurg Tashkent, with all of the teams playing out of the Humo Ice Dome. Semurg became the champions in the playoffs.

Uzbekistan Hockey Federation (UHF) began preparation for joining IIHF as a member and forming national ice hockey team in participating IIHF competitions.

Rugby union

Uzbekistan used to be part of the Soviet Union national rugby union team, but since its independence in 1991, Uzbekistan has created its own national team.

Handball
Handball is one of Uzbekistan's most popular sports, but nothing special has been achieved.

Water polo
Uzbekistan's women's national under-20 water polo team qualified to the 2021 FINA Junior Water Polo World Championships.

Chess
Uzbekistan scored a surprise win at the 2022 chess olympiad held in Chennai, India. The Uzbek team was undefeated, beating the higher-seeded Armenian and Dutch teams, and drawing the top seeds India and USA. The Uzbek team proved their staying power by placing second at the world team championships held at Jerusalem in November 2022. Uzbekistan's top player, Nodirkbek Abdusattorov is the current world champion of rapid chess, winning the 2021 rapid world championship in a playoff against Russian grandmaster Ian Nepomniachtchi.

Notable athletes

 Djamolidine Abdoujaparov, cyclist
 Artur Taymazov, wrestler 
 Ruslan Chagaev, boxer
 Lina Cheryazova, freestyle skier
 Elvira Saadi, gymnast
 Maksim Shatskikh, footballer
 Nodirbek Abdusattorov, chess player

References

External links
 Uzbek Olympic medal winners